The 1896 Syracuse Orangemen football team represented Syracuse University during the 1896 college football season. The head coach was George O. Redington, coaching his second season with the Orangemen. The team finished the season with a final record of 5–3–2.

Schedule

References

Syracuse
Syracuse Orange football seasons
Syracuse Orangemen football